The House of Haugwitz (Graf von Haugwitz) is the name of an old and influential Saxonian noble family originating from Meissen region.

History 
The Haugvitcs are an ancient Lusatian aristocratic family that was very branched in the Middle Ages and was written "von Haugwitz".
It spread to the area of Germany (Meissen), Silesia (where more than 12 lineages were created), then to Bohemia and Moravia.
At the beginning of the 15th century, the important representatives of the family included Mikuláš Haugvic from Tuhaneč, the court Marshal of Queen Sophia, the wife of Wenceslaus IV of Bohemia.
In 1346, the brothers Otto, Sweydiger and Kilian von Haugvic settled in Biskupice, Silesia, who are the founders of the new dynastic Haugvic family from Biskupice, which continued to function completely independently and became the most important Haugvic faction in Bohemia, Moravia and Silesia from 1494 to 1668.

Lines of the family 
At present, four lines of the Haugwitz family are public:

1) Haugwitz from the Meissen line (to this day in Germany)

2) The Haugwitzs of Biskupitz (to this day in Czech Republic)

3) Haugwitz family from Malá Obíše (to this day in Austria, Canada, Denmark, Sweden)

4) Haugwitz family from the Prussian line (to this day also in Moravia)

Notable members 

 Anna Margareta von Haugwitz, wife of Swedish count, statesman and military commander Carl Gustaf Wrangel
 Georg von Haugwitz
 Johann IX. von Haugwitz (1524-1595), Bishop of Meissen
 August Adolph von Haugwitz
 Friedrich Wilhelm Graf von Haugwitz (1702, Saxony – 1765), Austrian statesman
 Christian August Heinrich Kurt Graf von Haugwitz (1752, Silesia – 1832), Prussian statesman
 Luise von Haugwitz (1782–1855)
 Lawrence (Lance) Graf von Haugwitz-Hardenberg-Reventlow (1936–1972), a playboy

References

German-language surnames
Slavic-language surnames
 
Saxon nobility
German noble families
Silesian nobility
German Bohemian noble families
Moravian noble families
Czech people of German descent
Prussian nobility